"Miss Marmelstein" is a song composed by Harold Rome, first introduced by Barbra Streisand in the Broadway musical I Can Get It for You Wholesale.  The young secretary Miss Marmelstein is a supporting role in the show; in the song she laments everyone addressing her so formally. The song became the most memorable part of the musical, with Streisand routinely stopping the show.

The song was released as a promotional only single to radio in April 1962 with "Who Knows?" (performed by Marilyn Cooper) on the b-side. This marked Streisand's first appearance on a Columbia Records single.

Streisand's first name was misspelled on the vinyl as "Barbara".

Live performances
In 2000, Barbra performed the song during her Timeless concert tour, later included on the Timeless: Live in Concert album and DVD releases.

References

Barbra Streisand songs
1962 songs
Songs written by Harold Rome
Songs from musicals
1962 debut singles